The 2012 International Challenge Cup was held from March 8 to 12, 2012 at the Uithof in The Hague. Skaters competed in the disciplines of men's singles, ladies' singles on the senior, junior, novice, and pre-novice "Debs" levels, and pair skating at the junior level only.

The International Challenge Cup was held for the first time since 2009, as the previous year's event had been canceled.

Senior results

Men

Ladies

Junior results

Men

Ladies

Pairs

Novice results

Boys

Girls

Debs results

Boys

Girls

References

External links
 2012 International Challenge Cup official site: 
 Starting orders and results
 Official videos

International Challenge Cup
International Challenge Cup, 2012
International Challenge Cup